The Cure for Death by Lightning is the debut novel from Canadian author Gail Anderson-Dargatz. It was nominated for the Giller Prize, was awarded the Ethel Wilson Fiction Prize, and became a bestseller in Canada (selling over 100,000 copies) and Great Britain (where it won a Betty Trask Award).

Plot introduction
Set in an isolated farming community in Shuswap Country, British Columbia at the end of the Second World War it is a coming of age story containing elements of magic realism. Fifteen-year-old Beth Weeks has to contend with her family's struggle against poverty but also her increasingly paranoid and aggressive father whose behaviour leaves the family as outcasts in the community. A number of unusual characters appear in the book, including Filthy Billy a hired hand with tourettes and Nora a sensual half-Native girl whose mother has an extra little finger and a man's voice.  

The title of the book comes from one of a number of household tips and recipes belonging to her mother which appear as asides throughout the book, while Beth's mother withdraws from reality and talks with her dead mother; leaving Beth to be sexually molested by her father.

Reception
The Boston Sunday Globe described how, "some first novelists tiptoe. Not Gail Anderson-Dargatz. She makes her debut in full stride, confidently breaking the rules to create a fictional style we might call Pacific Northwest Gothic."
Canadian Literature quarterly criticizes the "somewhat ponderous plot" but praises the "acuteness of vision" and "sharp rendition of the breathless, sensate moment" as the "magic in the ordinary" is revealed.

References

1996 Canadian novels
Canadian magic realism novels
Novels set in British Columbia
Canadian Gothic novels
Canadian bildungsromans
Shuswap Country
Knopf Canada books
Houghton Mifflin books
1996 debut novels